Thomas Francis Kennedy (March 23, 1858 – August 28, 1917) was a bishop of the Catholic Church in the United States. He served as the Rector of the Pontifical North American College from 1901–1917.

Biography

Early life and education
Thomas Kennedy was born in Plymouth Meeting, Pennsylvania. His father, Patrick, worked as a laborer.  He was educated in a local public school, St. Matthew's School and Treemont Seminary.  Kennedy became a teacher at St. Matthew's High School at age 17 and then later became the principal.  He entered St. Charles Borromeo Seminary to study for the priesthood and continued his studies in Rome at the Pontifical North American College.

Kennedy was ordained a priest in Rome for the Archdiocese of Philadelphia on July 24, 1887 by Cardinal Lucido Parocchi, the Vicar General of Rome.  After he returned to Pennsylvania, Kennedy joined the faculty at St. Charles Borromeo Seminary.  He was named the Rector of the Pontifical North American College on June 14, 1901.

Bishop
Pope Pius X appointed him as the Titular Bishop of Hadrianopolis in Honoriade on December 16, 1907.  He was consecrated a bishop by Cardinal Girolamo Maria Gotti, O.C.D., the Prefect of the Congregation for Propagation of the Faith, on December 29, 1907. The principal co-consecrators were Archbishop Patrick Riordan of San Francisco and Bishop William Giles, Rector of the English College in Rome.

Archbishop
Kennedy was given the personal title of Archbishop by Pope Benedict XV on June 17, 1915.  At the same time he was changed to the titular see of Seleucia in Isauria.  He died in Rome on August 28, 1917 at the age of 59, and was buried in the Cimitero Comunale Monumentale Campo Verano in Rome.

Portrait
In May 1907, whilst painting his first portrait of Pope Pius X, the Swiss-born American artist Adolfo Müller-Ury completed the first of two portraits of Bishop Kennedy whom he had befriended. This bust-length oval portrait, described by the New York Evening Mail as 'warmly tinted and attractive', was exhibited in January and February 1908 at Knoedler's Gallery in New York, The Corcoran Gallery in Washington, D.C., and in Philadelphia, before apparently being sent to Kennedy's two sisters, Theresa and Margaret, who apparently later gave it to the St. Charles Borromeo Seminary, Overbrook, Pennsylvania, where it hangs today outside the Eakins Room. Müller-Ury's second much-larger half-length standing portrait of Kennedy was executed in 1911 when he was in Rome painting Pope Pius X again (which he presented to the Catholic University in Washington, D.C.) and remains at the North American College in Rome's Graduate House.

Legacy
Archbishop Kennedy's birthplace (built 1776), at 113 W. Germantown Pike, is a contributing property in the Plymouth Meeting Historic District.

References

1858 births
1917 deaths
People from Conshohocken, Pennsylvania
St. Charles Borromeo Seminary alumni
Pontifical North American College alumni
Roman Catholic Archdiocese of Philadelphia
Pontifical North American College rectors
20th-century American Roman Catholic titular archbishops
American Roman Catholic clergy of Irish descent
Religious leaders from Pennsylvania
Catholics from Pennsylvania